was a Japanese painter, the founder of the Tosa school of Japanese painting. Born into a family that had traditionally served as painters to the Imperial court, he was head of the court painting bureau from 1493 to 1496. In 1518, he was appointed chief artist to the Ashikaga shogunates.

See also 
 Higashiyama Bunka in Muromachi period

References

External links 
Bridge of dreams: the Mary Griggs Burke collection of Japanese art, a catalog from The Metropolitan Museum of Art Libraries (fully available online as PDF), which contains material on Tosa Mitsunobu (see index)

Japanese painters
1434 births
1525 deaths